Deh-e Nasir (also Romanized as Deh-e Naşīr, Deh-e Nāşer, and Deh Nāsir) is a village in Pachehlak-e Sharqi Rural District, in the Central District of Aligudarz County, Lorestan Province, Iran. At the 2006 census, its population was 701, in 150 families.

References 

Towns and villages in Aligudarz County